"On Fire" is a song by Lithuanian pop-rock band The Roop. The song was released as a digital download on 17 January 2020. It was scheduled to represent Lithuania in the Eurovision Song Contest 2020. After the cancellation of Eurovision 2020, it won Eurovision 2020 - das deutsche Finale, the German alternative Eurovision show.

Eurovision Song Contest

The song was set to represent Lithuania in the Eurovision Song Contest 2020, after The Roop was selected through Pabandom iš naujo! Let's try again! 2020, the music competition that selects Lithuania's entries for the Eurovision Song Contest. On 28 January 2020, a special allocation draw was held which placed each country into one of the two semi-finals, as well as which half of the show they would perform in. Lithuania was placed into the first semi-final, originally planned to be held on 12 May 2020 but later cancelled, and was scheduled to perform in the first half of the show.

Charts

Release history

References

2020 singles
Eurovision songs of 2020
Eurovision songs of Lithuania
The Roop songs